Hobe Sound Christian Academy (HSCA) is a private, PreK-12 Christian school which shares the campus of Hobe Sound Bible College, about 25 miles north of West Palm Beach, Florida.

Hobe Sound Christian Academy began in 1960 as a service to the children of faculty to Hobe Sound Bible College, a seminary in the Wesleyan-Arminian (Methodist) tradition. It is operated under the auspices of Hobe Sound Bible College and is open to all students. HSCA is committed to offering a Christ-centered education.

References

External links

Christian schools in Florida
Hobe Sound, Florida
Schools in Martin County, Florida
Private high schools in Florida
Private middle schools in Florida
Private elementary schools in Florida
Methodist schools in the United States